José Joaquín Ballivián Achondo (born 22 April 1993) is a Chilean shot putter.

Career
He won a gold medal in shot put at the 2010 South American Youth Championships in Athletics, throwing 20.53 metres to establish a new South American Youth Best.

Ballivián participated in the shot put at the 2010 Summer Youth Olympics.

Personal bests

Achievements

References

External links

1993 births
Living people
Chilean male shot putters
Athletes (track and field) at the 2010 Summer Youth Olympics
Sportspeople from Santiago
21st-century Chilean people